Lee Scott may refer to:

 Lee Scott (businessman) (born 1949), American businessman and former CEO of Wal-Mart
 Lee Scott (politician) (born 1956), British former Member of Parliament
 K. Lee Scott (born 1950), teacher, musician, conductor and composer
Lee Scott (rapper), a UK-based rapper and hip hop producer, and founder of Blah Records

See also